The Thredbo River, a perennial river of the Snowy River catchment, is located in the Snowy Mountains region of New South Wales, Australia.

Course and features
The Thredbo River rises below South Rams Head, near Mount Leo within the Kosciuszko National Park. The river flows generally adjacent to the Alpine Way, west and northwest near Dead Horse Gap, then generally north, passing through the village of Thredbo, joined by four tributaries including the Little Thredbo River, before emptying into Lake Jindabyne, impounded by Jindabyne Dam. Within Lake Jindabyne, the river reaches its confluence with the Snowy River.

The river descends  over its  course.

The flow of the river is impacted by alpine conditions; with high flows during spring as a result of snow melt. Meanwhile, during winter, the river is subject to snow and ice conditions.

Historical alternative names 
The river was once also known by an alternative name, Crackenback River. It was officially named 'Thredbo or Crackenback River', until January 1976, when it was renamed  'Thredbo River'.

Gallery

See also

 List of rivers of New South Wales (L-Z)
 List of rivers of Australia
 Rivers of New South Wales
 Snowy Mountains Scheme

References

External links
Snowy Flow Response Monitoring and Modelling

 

Rivers of New South Wales
Snowy Mountains Scheme